Partido Magdalo is one of the political parties in the Philippines founded by Former Governor Juanito Remulla, Sr. and Former Congressman Renato P. Dragon. It is a local political party in Cavite.The new leaders of this party is current Cavite Governor Juanito Victor "Jonvic" Remulla, Jr. and former Cavite Governor Jesus "Boying" Remulla.

The name derives from the pseudonym of Emilio Aguinaldo as a Katipunan member as well as of its council for town of Kawit during the Philippine Revolution, Aguinaldo having been born and raised in the town, called Cavite el Viejo during Spanish times.

Notable members 
Many of notable members and politicians are the following:

President: Governor Juanito Victor C. Remulla, Jr.
Secretary: former City Mayor Homer T. Saquilayan (Imus)
Members
 Congress
 Representative Ramon Jolo Revilla III 1st District of Cavite
 Representative Lani Mercado-Revilla 2nd District of Cavite
 Cities and MunicipalitiesMayor Strike Revilla (Bacoor)Mayor Yuri A. Pacumio (Tanza)Mayor Benjarde A. Villanueva (Amadeo)Congressman Dahlia A. Loyola (Carmona)Mayor Roy Loyola (Carmona)Mayor Melandres G. de Sagun (Trece Martires)Mayor Gemma Buendia-Lubigan (Trece Martires)Mayor Junio C. Dualan, Sr. (Naic)Mayor Bernardo S. Paredes, Sr. (Cavite City)Mayor Enrico M. Alvarez (Noveleta)Mayor Emila Lourdes F. Poblete (Silang)Mayor Virgilio P. Varias (Alfonso)Mayor Danilo M. Bencito (Bailen)Mayor Edwin V. Sisante (Magallanes)Mayor Herminio Lindo (Ternate)Mayor Fredrick A. Vida (Mendez)Mayor Bienvenido V. Dimero (Indang)Vice Mayor Raymundo Del Rosario (Tanza)Vice Mayor Armando Bernal (Kawit)Vice Mayor Jose Rozel Hernandez (Rosario)Former Vice Mayor Percival Cabuhat (General Mariano Alvarez)City Councilor Jeffrey Asistio (Imus)City Councilor Edgardo T. Saquilayan (Imus)Vice Mayor Maurito C. Sison(General Trias)City Councilor Jacinto Frani Jr.''' (Dasmarinas)
The Sangguniang Panlalawigan of Cavite (2013-2016) is composed of twelve (8) Partido Magdalo Members:
 Hon. Dino Carlo R. Chua (Majority Leader) - 1st District/
 Hon. Ryan R. Enriquez - 1st District/
 Hon. Edralin G. Gawaran - 2nd District/
 Hon. Rolando S. Remulla - 2nd District/
 Hon. Marcos C. Amutan - 5th District/
 Hon. Ivee Jayne A. Reyes - 5th District/
 Hon. Hermogenes Arayta III - 6th District/
 Hon. Irene D.P. Bencito - 7th District/
 Hon. Mark Joseph T. Mupas - PCL President/
 Hon. Gloria Fernandez - ABC President/

Party performances in local elections 
2010
Province of Cavite was divided into seven Congressional Districts. (originally 3 Districts)
Partido Magdalo reclaimed its glory by winning the seat of power at the Provincial Capitol upon the victory of Governor Juanito Victor Remulla, Jr., son of former governor Juanito Remulla, founder of the party. In Imus, Partido Magdalo also became victorious after Mayor Homer T. Saquilayan was elected against re-electionist mayor Emmanuel Maliksi by a wide margin. In the following weeks, Maliksi filed an electoral protest and was declared by the Imus Regional Trial Court the winner by 665 votes in 2011. However, on March 12, 2013 he was declared by the Supreme Court the true winner, he took his oath six days later on March 18. On April 11, it reversed its ruling and remanded the case back to the COMELEC.

The Sangguniang Panlalawigan of Cavite (2010-2013) is composed of Partido Magdalo Members:

Hon. Dino Carlo R. Chua (Senior Board Member) - 1st District/
Hon. Cecille Miranda (Majority Floor Leader) - ABC President/
Hon. Marcos Amutan - 5th District/
Hon. Irene Bencito - 7th District /
Hon. Maurito Sison - PCL President/

2013

In 2012, Liga ng mga Barangay Pres. Jolo Revilla agreed to team up with Gov. Remulla, to aim to defeat the Aquino-backed Rep. Ayong Maliksi and Vice-Governor Recto Cantimbuhan, which he dropped by the Liberals and replaced by Ronald Jay Lacson, son of Sen. Panfilo Lacson. Remulla was also join the Lakas–CMD party of Sen. Bong Revilla, and one of the opposition party. Remulla and Revilla won against Maliksi and Lacson. In the Congress only Lani Mercado-Revilla and Luis Ferrer IV won. In the provincial board 8 out of 14 seats won, which led by Dino Chua.

2016

2019

2022

References

Conservative parties in the Philippines
Local political parties in the Philippines
Politics of Cavite
Regionalist parties
Regionalist parties in the Philippines